Constitutive may refer to:

 In physics, a constitutive equation is a relation between two physical quantities
 In ecology, a constitutive defense is one that is always active, as opposed to an inducible defense
 Constitutive theory of statehood
 In genetics, a constitutive gene is always expressed – see constitutive expression